France amateur national team may refer to:
 France national amateur football team
 France national amateur rugby union team